This is a List of Rajasthan List A cricket records, with each list containing the top five performances in the category.

Currently active players are bolded.

Team records

Highest innings totals

Lowest innings totals

Batting records

Highest individual scores

Bowling records

Best innings bowling

References

All lists are referenced to CricketArchive.

See also

 Rajasthan cricket team
 List of Rajasthan first-class cricket records

Cricket in Rajasthan